The 2021–22 Oregon State Beavers men's basketball team represented Oregon State University in the 2021–22 NCAA Division I men's basketball season. The Beavers were led by eighth-year head coach Wayne Tinkle, and played their home games at Gill Coliseum in Corvallis, Oregon as members of the Pac-12 Conference. They finished the season 3–28, 1–19 in Pac-12 play to finish in last place. They lost to Oregon in the first round of the Pac-12 tournament.

Previous season
In a season limited due to the ongoing COVID-19 pandemic, the Beavers finished the 2020–21 season 20–13, 10–10 in Pac-12 play to finish in sixth place. 

Despite being picked to finish last in the Pac-12 standings in preseason media polls, the Beavers finished tied for sixth in conference play and received a 5-seed in the Pac-12 tournament due to Arizona's self-imposed ban. Despite the Beavers' outperforming of low expectations, the consensus among analysts entering the Pac-12 tournament was that OSU would not receive an at-large bid to the upcoming NCAA tournament, and thus needed to win the conference tournament to make the field as an automatic qualifier. The Beavers proceeded to defeat 4-seed UCLA in overtime, top-seed and rival Oregon, and 3-seed Colorado in succession to win their first Pac-12 tournament title in school history and guarantee just their second NCAA tournament berth since 1990. 

Seeded 12th in the Midwest region in the 2021 NCAA tournament, the Beavers would trail for less than five combined minutes in upset wins over 5th-seeded Tennessee and 4th-seeded Oklahoma State to advance to the Sweet Sixteen. The wins were Oregon State's first in the NCAA tournament since advancing to the Elite Eight in 1982.  The Beavers next overcame a slow start to defeat 8-seed Loyola-Chicago and advance to the Elite Eight, matching their 1982 run. Over their six-game postseason winning streak dating back to the Pac-12 tournament, the Beavers were not favored in a single game. They became just the second ever 12-seed to advance to the Elite Eight since the tournament expanded to 64 teams in 1985.

Facing the 2-seed Houston Cougars in the Midwest regional final, the Beavers rallied from a 17-point second half deficit to tie the game with under four minutes remaining. Houston would prevail, 67–61, to end Oregon State's Cinderella run.

Off-season

Departures

Incoming transfers

2021 recruiting class

2022 Recruiting class

Roster

Schedule and results
Source:

|-
!colspan=12 style=| Exhibition
 
|-
!colspan=12 style=| Regular season

|-
!colspan=12 style=| Pac-12 tournament

Notes

References

Oregon State Beavers men's basketball seasons
Oregon State
Oregon State Beavers men's basketball
Oregon State Beavers men's basketball